Munhall is a borough in Allegheny County, Pennsylvania, United States, on the west bank of the Monongahela River,  south of the confluence of the Monongahela and the Allegheny rivers where the Ohio River begins. It abuts the borough of Homestead.

A large part of the Homestead Works of the Carnegie Steel Company existed in Munhall. Steel products were the only items made in Munhall in 1910 when 5,185 people lived here. In 1940, 13,900 people lived in Munhall. The population was 10,774 at the 2020 census. Munhall, along with the boroughs of Homestead and West Homestead, is served by the Steel Valley School District.

History
A post office called Munhall was established in 1887. The borough was formed on June 24, 1901, out of a part of Mifflin Township, and named for John Munhall, the original owner of the town site.

Attractions

The Homestead Library, located in Munhall, was donated by Andrew Carnegie in 1896.  It has been restored and modernized during the last quarter of a century - new electrical lighting has been installed, computers for the use of visitors have been installed, and the gloominess inside has vanished. Additionally, there are indoor pools, basketball courts, and other recreational facilities.

In 2000, Continental Realestate Companies opened The Waterfront.  This large "LifeStyle" shopping center was built on the former site of the Carnegie Steel Works.  Most of the structures associated with the steel mills on this site were demolished during construction. Still standing in the Waterfront development are some of the brick stacks from the Homestead Steel Works. In addition, near the river is a former mill structure known as the Pump House which was restored by the developer.

The Byzantine Catholic Cathedral of St. John the Baptist, serving the Archeparchy of Pittsburgh, is also located in the borough.

Geography
Munhall is located at  (40.391202, -79.901221).

Surrounding and adjacent communities
Munhall has six land borders, including Whitaker to the east, West Mifflin to the south and east, West Homestead to the west, Homestead to the northwest, and the Pittsburgh neighborhoods of Lincoln Place to the southwest and New Homestead to the south-southwest.

Across the Monongahela River, Munhall runs adjacent with (from north to southeast) the Pittsburgh neighborhood of Swisshelm Park, Swissvale and Rankin.

Demographics

As of the census of 2000, there were 12,264 people, 5,364 households, and 3,239 families residing in the borough. The population density was 5,311.2 people per square mile (2,049.9/km2). There were 5,780 housing units at an average density of 2,503.2 per square mile (966.1/km2). The racial makeup of the borough was 94.78% White, 3.38% African American, 0.02% Native American, 0.61% Asian, 0.29% from other races, and 0.92% from two or more races. Hispanic or Latino of any race were 0.80% of the population.

There were 5,364 households, out of which 24.5% had children under the age of 18 living with them, 43.5% were married couples living together, 13.4% had a female householder with no husband present, and 39.6% were non-families. 35.7% of all households were made up of individuals, and 19.3% had someone living alone who was 65 years of age or older. The average household size was 2.25 and the average family size was 2.95.

In the borough the population was spread out, with 20.7% under the age of 18, 6.9% from 18 to 24, 26.8% from 25 to 44, 23.2% from 45 to 64, and 22.3% who were 65 years of age or older. The median age was 42 years. For every 100 females, there were 85.0 males. For every 100 females age 18 and over, there were 81.3 males.

The median income for a household in the borough was $32,832, and the median income for a family was $41,847. Males had a median income of $32,202 versus $24,029 for females. The per capita income for the borough was $18,052. About 9.7% of families and 11.9% of the population were below the poverty line, including 18.2% of those under age 18 and 7.8% of those age 65 or over.

Government and politics

Notable people
 Gabby Barrett, American Idol, ABC Revival Contestant Third Place Finisher
 Albert Belan, Former Member of the Pennsylvania State Senate
 Luke Getsy, Chicago Bears Offensive Coordinator
 Tom Ridge, U.S. Representative from Pennsylvania and the 43rd Governor of Pennsylvania

References

External links
 
 

X

Populated places established in 1901
Pittsburgh metropolitan area
Boroughs in Allegheny County, Pennsylvania
Pennsylvania populated places on the Monongahela River
1901 establishments in Pennsylvania